The theme for 2008 was European Cultural Heritage.

Malta

See also

References

External links

 The Euro Coins Collection Network 

Coins of the Eurozone